The Sheffield Gang Wars is an umbrella term used to describe a large period between the 19th and 20th centuries in which the City of Sheffield saw a rise in criminal gang activity. The notoriety of some gangs led to the formation of the 'Special Duties Squad' by Percy Sillitoe.

Though other UK cities have historically had more widespread violence, mostly concentrated in dense urban areas such as London, Manchester and Liverpool and more notorious criminal gangs such as the Peaky Blinders of Birmingham also exist. The sheer brutality of Sheffield's gangs earned the city the nickname 'Little Chicago', in reference to gang culture within Chicago in the United States during the same period.

References

History of Sheffield
Crime in Sheffield
Gangs in England
Organised crime conflicts in the United Kingdom